Richard Albert Fitzgerald (1806 – ) was an Irish Repeal Association politician.

He was educated at Clongowes Wood College and St. Patrick's, Carlow College, and also spent some time being taught in Paris.

References

External links
 

UK MPs 1841–1847
Irish Repeal Association MPs
1806 births
1847 deaths
People educated at Clongowes Wood College
Alumni of Carlow College
Members of the Parliament of the United Kingdom for County Tipperary constituencies (1801–1922)